George Petrou is a Greek conductor, pianist and stage-director.

Biography
George Petrou was born in Greece. He studied at the Athens Conservatoire, the Royal College and the Royal Academy of Music in London. He started an early career as a concert pianist, but quickly turned into conducting developing a parallel interest in historical keyboard instruments and their practices. Since 2012 he is the artistic director of the renowned Athens based orchestra Armonia Atenea (former Athens Camerata) with which he tours and records extensively, performing both on period or modern instruments.

From the season 2021–22 he will be the new artistic director of the historical Internationale Händel-Festspiele Göttingen.

Additionally, he has developed a vivid interest in stage-directing and has recently signed several successful opera and musical theater productions, including Handel's Alcina, C. Porter's Kiss Me Kate, L. Bernstein's West Side Story, S. Sondheim's Sweeney Todd and Company and The Godson by Theofrastos Sakellarides, the most celebrated Greek operetta.

He has been a guest of major opera houses including the Opera de Toulouse, the Oper Leipzig, the Oper Köln, the Opera de Strasbourg, the Opera de Nice, the Theater an der Wien, the Nederlandse Reisopera, the Opera de Lausanne, the Opera of St. Gallen, the Opera of Bern, the Korea National Opera, the Teatro Petrucelli, the Teatro Verdi di Trieste, the Theatre Champs Elysees, the opera Royale de Versailles, the Royal Opera in Stockholm, the Greek National Opera working with orchestras such as the  Munich Radio Orchestra, the Gewandhaus Leipzig, the Orchestre Nationale de Capitole du Toulouse, the Orchestre Philharmonique de Nice, the Noord Nederlands Orkest, the B'Rock, the NAC Orchestra (Ottawa), the Südwestdeutsche Philharmonie, the Norwegian Chamber Orchestra, the Trondheim Symphony Orchestra, the Concerto Köln, the Pomo d'Oro, the Bilkent Symphony Orchestra, the Bern Symphony Orchestra, the Cottbus Philharmonie, the Athens and Thessaloniki State Orchestras, the Greek Radio Symphony Orchestra, the Bratislava Philharmonic, the Musica Viva, the New Russia Symphony Orchestra.
He has performed at major festivals including the Salzburg Pfingsfestspiele, the BBC Proms, the Klara festival in Brussels, the Handel festivals of Halle and Karlsruhe, the festival de Valle Itria (Martina Franca).

George Petrou has been a very active recording artist, collaborating with the world's major recording companies, including Deutsche Gramophone, DECCA, MDG. All his recordings have received the highest critical acclaim from the international press (Diapason d’Or, Preis der Deutsche Schalplattenkritik, Choc-Monde de la Musique, Gramophone-Editor's Choice, BBC Mag/Recording of the Month, CD of the week-Sunday Times, Recording of the month in Musicweb, Crescendo Bestenliste Platz 1, etc.). Tamerlano received the prestigious ECHO KLASSIC 2008, and Alessandro the Recording of the Year at the International Opera Awards, and the opera was voted by the viewers of Mezzo as opera of the Year 2013 receiving more than 250,000 votes. George Petrou has received a Grammy Nomination (for Handel's Ottone released by Decca) and a Pοrin Awards nomination (for Handel's Alessandro also by Decca). He was honored as an Associate of the Royal Academy of Music, London (ARAM), was awarded the title of Chevalier de l'ordre des Arts et des Lettres from the French government and the Grand Prize for Music 2018 from the association of the Greek Critics of Music and Drama.

Discography

G. F. Händel : Oreste (pasticcio) (MDG)
G. F. Händel : Arianna in Creta (MDG)
G. F. Händel : Tamerlano (MDG)
G. F. Händel : Giulio Cesare (MDG)
G. F. Händel : Alessandro Severo (pasticcio) (MDG). Bonus: Niccolo Mantzaro: Don Crepuscolo
G. F. Händel : Alessandro (Decca)
G. F. Handel: Arminio (Decca). Also a DVD issued by the Internazionale Händel-Festspiele Karlsruhe
S. Mayr : La Lodoiska (OEHMS)
S. Mayr: Ginevra di Scozia (OEHMS)
L. v. Beethoven : Die Geschöpfe des Prometheus (Decca)
J. A. Hasse : Siroe (Decca)
Rossini Arias with Franco Fagioli (Deutsche Gramophone)
J. A. Hasse : ROKOKO with Max Emanuel Cencic (Decca)
C. W. Gluck : Arias with Daniel Behle (Decca)
A Countertenor gala (Decca)
Baroque Divas (Decca)
ARCHEΤYPON with Mary Ellen Nesi. (MDG)
CATHARSIS with Xavier Sabata (Apartè)
Masks by Dimitris Papadimitriou (Elliniko Sxedio)
39 Myths by Dimitris Papadimitriou (Elliniko Sxedio)
The chronicle of an early Automn by Dimitris Papadimitriou (Elliniko Sxedio)
Paintings by Dimitris Papadimitriou. (Elliniko Sxedio)

External links 
 

Living people
Greek pianists
21st-century pianists
Year of birth missing (living people)
Musicians from Athens